USS Maysie (SP-930) was a United States Navy patrol vessel in commission from February to December 1918.

Maysie was built in 1899 as the private motor yacht Verano by the Daimler Manufacturing Company at Astoria on Long Island, New York. She soon was renamed Laurena. In 1901, James Harkness sold her to Oscar Lipton of New York City, and she later operated under the name Maysie. By 1917, Maysie was the property of M. C. Schweinert.

In 1917, the U.S. Navy acquired Maysie from Schweinert for use as a section patrol boat during World War I. She was commissioned as USS Maysie (SP-930) on 19 February 1918.

Assigned to the 3rd Naval District and based at New York City, Maysie operated on patrol duties for the rest of World War I.

Maysie was decommissioned on 8 December 1918 and was returned to Schweinert the same day.

Notes

References 
 
 Department of the Navy Naval History and Heritage Command Online Library of Selected Images: Civilian Ships: Maysie (Motor Boat, 1899). Previously named Verano and Laurena. Served as USS Maysie (SP-930) in 1918
 NavSource Online: Section Patrol Craft Photo Archive Maysie (SP 930)

Patrol vessels of the United States Navy
World War I patrol vessels of the United States
Ships built in Queens, New York
1899 ships
Individual yachts